ThYme (Thioester-active enzYme) is database of enzymes constituting the fatty acid synthesis and polyketide synthesis cycles.

See also
 Thioester

References

External links
 http://www.enzyme.cbirc.iastate.edu

Biosynthesis
Enzyme databases
Fatty acids
Genetics databases
Metabolism
Thioesters